The 1983–84 New York Rangers season was the franchise's 58th season. The Rangers posted a 42–29–9 record in the regular season, and their fourth-place finish in the Patrick Division earned them a berth in the NHL playoffs. In the Patrick Division semi-finals, the Rangers lost to the New York Islanders, three games to two.

Regular season

Final standings

Schedule and results

|- align="center" bgcolor="#CCFFCC"
| 1 || 5 || New Jersey Devils || 6 - 2 || 1-0-0
|- align="center" bgcolor="#CCFFCC"
| 2 || 7 || @ New Jersey Devils || 3 - 1 || 2-0-0
|- align="center" bgcolor="#CCFFCC"
| 3 || 8 || @ Pittsburgh Penguins || 6 - 1 || 3-0-0
|- align="center" bgcolor="#CCFFCC"
| 4 || 10 || Los Angeles Kings || 2 - 1 || 4-0-0
|- align="center" bgcolor="#CCFFCC"
| 5 || 13 || Washington Capitals || 4 - 3 || 5-0-0
|- align="center" bgcolor="#FFBBBB"
| 6 || 15 || @ St. Louis Blues || 6 - 5 || 5-1-0
|- align="center" bgcolor="#CCFFCC"
| 7 || 16 || Philadelphia Flyers || 5 - 4 || 6-1-0
|- align="center" bgcolor="#CCFFCC"
| 8 || 19 || Calgary Flames || 3 - 1 || 7-1-0
|- align="center" bgcolor="#CCFFCC"
| 9 || 22 || @ New York Islanders || 3 - 2 || 8-1-0
|- align="center" bgcolor="#CCFFCC"
| 10 || 23 || New York Islanders || 6 - 5 OT || 9-1-0
|- align="center" bgcolor="#FFBBBB"
| 11 || 26 || Winnipeg Jets || 7 - 5 || 9-2-0
|- align="center" bgcolor="#FFBBBB"
| 12 || 28 || Toronto Maple Leafs || 5 - 3 || 9-3-0
|- align="center" bgcolor="#FFBBBB"
| 13 || 30 || Edmonton Oilers || 5 - 4 OT || 9-4-0
|-

|- align="center" bgcolor="white"
| 14 || 2 || @ Buffalo Sabres || 3 - 3 OT || 9-4-1
|- align="center" bgcolor="white"
| 15 || 5 || @ Quebec Nordiques || 4 - 4 OT || 9-4-2
|- align="center" bgcolor="#CCFFCC"
| 16 || 8 || @ New Jersey Devils || 5 - 1 || 10-4-2
|- align="center" bgcolor="#CCFFCC"
| 17 || 9 || Calgary Flames || 4 - 3 || 11-4-2
|- align="center" bgcolor="#FFBBBB"
| 18 || 12 || @ Washington Capitals || 7 - 4 || 11-5-2
|- align="center" bgcolor="#CCFFCC"
| 19 || 13 || Detroit Red Wings || 6 - 3 || 12-5-2
|- align="center" bgcolor="#CCFFCC"
| 20 || 16 || Washington Capitals || 4 - 1 || 13-5-2
|- align="center" bgcolor="white"
| 21 || 19 || @ Boston Bruins || 6 - 6 OT || 13-5-3
|- align="center" bgcolor="#CCFFCC"
| 22 || 20 || Quebec Nordiques || 6 - 5 OT || 14-5-3
|- align="center" bgcolor="#FFBBBB"
| 23 || 23 || Buffalo Sabres || 6 - 4 || 14-6-3
|- align="center" bgcolor="#FFBBBB"
| 24 || 25 || @ Washington Capitals || 3 - 1 || 14-7-3
|- align="center" bgcolor="#FFBBBB"
| 25 || 26 || @ Hartford Whalers || 4 - 3 OT || 14-8-3
|- align="center" bgcolor="white"
| 26 || 28 || Vancouver Canucks || 3 - 3 OT || 14-8-4
|- align="center" bgcolor="#FFBBBB"
| 27 || 30 || Chicago Black Hawks || 4 - 0 || 14-9-4
|-

|- align="center" bgcolor="#CCFFCC"
| 28 || 3 || @ Detroit Red Wings || 4 - 2 || 15-9-4
|- align="center" bgcolor="#CCFFCC"
| 29 || 4 || Minnesota North Stars || 6 - 4 || 16-9-4
|- align="center" bgcolor="#CCFFCC"
| 30 || 7 || Washington Capitals || 7 - 5 || 17-9-4
|- align="center" bgcolor="#FFBBBB"
| 31 || 12 || New Jersey Devils || 7 - 3 || 17-10-4
|- align="center" bgcolor="#FFBBBB"
| 32 || 14 || Edmonton Oilers || 9 - 4 || 17-11-4
|- align="center" bgcolor="#FFBBBB"
| 33 || 17 || @ New York Islanders || 7 - 1 || 17-12-4
|- align="center" bgcolor="#CCFFCC"
| 34 || 21 || Pittsburgh Penguins || 6 - 1 || 18-12-4
|- align="center" bgcolor="#CCFFCC"
| 35 || 23 || Chicago Black Hawks || 3 - 2 || 19-12-4
|- align="center" bgcolor="#FFBBBB"
| 36 || 26 || @ Pittsburgh Penguins || 7 - 4 || 19-13-4
|- align="center" bgcolor="#CCFFCC"
| 37 || 28 || @ Chicago Black Hawks || 7 - 4 || 20-13-4
|- align="center" bgcolor="#CCFFCC"
| 38 || 30 || Philadelphia Flyers || 6 - 3 || 21-13-4
|- align="center" bgcolor="#CCFFCC"
| 39 || 31 || @ Buffalo Sabres || 3 - 2 || 22-13-4
|-

|- align="center" bgcolor="white"
| 40 || 2 || @ Washington Capitals || 2 - 2 OT || 22-13-5
|- align="center" bgcolor="#CCFFCC"
| 41 || 4 || New Jersey Devils || 4 - 3 OT || 23-13-5
|- align="center" bgcolor="#FFBBBB"
| 42 || 7 || @ Boston Bruins || 5 - 2 || 23-14-5
|- align="center" bgcolor="#CCFFCC"
| 43 || 8 || New York Islanders || 5 - 4 || 24-14-5
|- align="center" bgcolor="#CCFFCC"
| 44 || 12 || @ Philadelphia Flyers || 2 - 1 || 25-14-5
|- align="center" bgcolor="#FFBBBB"
| 45 || 14 || @ New York Islanders || 4 - 2 || 25-15-5
|- align="center" bgcolor="#CCFFCC"
| 46 || 16 || Detroit Red Wings || 8 - 5 || 26-15-5
|- align="center" bgcolor="#CCFFCC"
| 47 || 18 || St. Louis Blues || 6 - 2 || 27-15-5
|- align="center" bgcolor="#FFBBBB"
| 48 || 20 || Pittsburgh Penguins || 6 - 3 || 27-16-5
|- align="center" bgcolor="#CCFFCC"
| 49 || 21 || @ Toronto Maple Leafs || 6 - 3 || 28-16-5
|- align="center" bgcolor="#CCFFCC"
| 50 || 25 || @ Pittsburgh Penguins || 6 - 3 || 29-16-5
|- align="center" bgcolor="#FFBBBB"
| 51 || 26 || Montreal Canadiens || 4 - 2 || 29-17-5
|- align="center" bgcolor="#CCFFCC"
| 52 || 29 || St. Louis Blues || 3 - 2 || 30-17-5
|-

|- align="center" bgcolor="#FFBBBB"
| 53 || 2 || @ Calgary Flames || 8 - 1 || 30-18-5
|- align="center" bgcolor="#CCFFCC"
| 54 || 4 || @ Vancouver Canucks || 5 - 4 || 31-18-5
|- align="center" bgcolor="white"
| 55 || 5 || @ Los Angeles Kings || 3 - 3 OT || 31-18-6
|- align="center" bgcolor="#CCFFCC"
| 56 || 8 || @ Winnipeg Jets || 3 - 1 || 32-18-6
|- align="center" bgcolor="white"
| 57 || 9 || @ Minnesota North Stars || 4 - 4 OT || 32-18-7
|- align="center" bgcolor="white"
| 58 || 11 || @ Los Angeles Kings || 6 - 6 OT || 32-18-8
|- align="center" bgcolor="#CCFFCC"
| 59 || 15 || New York Islanders || 3 - 2 || 33-18-8
|- align="center" bgcolor="#FFBBBB"
| 60 || 18 || @ New York Islanders || 4 - 3 || 33-19-8
|- align="center" bgcolor="#FFBBBB"
| 61 || 19 || Philadelphia Flyers || 3 - 2 OT || 33-20-8
|- align="center" bgcolor="#CCFFCC"
| 62 || 23 || Quebec Nordiques || 4 - 2 || 34-20-8
|- align="center" bgcolor="#FFBBBB"
| 63 || 25 || @ Montreal Canadiens || 7 - 4 || 34-21-8
|- align="center" bgcolor="#CCFFCC"
| 64 || 26 || Pittsburgh Penguins || 4 - 3 OT || 35-21-8
|- align="center" bgcolor="white"
| 65 || 28 || @ New Jersey Devils || 3 - 3 OT || 35-21-9
|- align="center" bgcolor="#FFBBBB"
| 66 || 29 || @ Toronto Maple Leafs || 3 - 1 || 35-22-9
|-

|- align="center" bgcolor="#FFBBBB"
| 67 || 3 || @ Washington Capitals || 5 - 1 || 35-23-9
|- align="center" bgcolor="#FFBBBB"
| 68 || 4 || Vancouver Canucks || 5 - 4 || 35-24-9
|- align="center" bgcolor="#FFBBBB"
| 69 || 7 || @ Minnesota North Stars || 6 - 3 || 35-25-9
|- align="center" bgcolor="#CCFFCC"
| 70 || 9 || @ Winnipeg Jets || 6 - 5 OT || 36-25-9
|- align="center" bgcolor="#CCFFCC"
| 71 || 10 || @ Edmonton Oilers || 3 - 2 || 37-25-9
|- align="center" bgcolor="#CCFFCC"
| 72 || 14 || Philadelphia Flyers || 6 - 3 || 38-25-9
|- align="center" bgcolor="#FFBBBB"
| 73 || 17 || @ Philadelphia Flyers || 6 - 4 || 38-26-9
|- align="center" bgcolor="#FFBBBB"
| 74 || 20 || Boston Bruins || 6 - 4 || 38-27-9
|- align="center" bgcolor="#CCFFCC"
| 75 || 22 || @ New Jersey Devils || 5 - 3 || 39-27-9
|- align="center" bgcolor="#FFBBBB"
| 76 || 24 || @ Philadelphia Flyers || 6 - 5 || 39-28-9
|- align="center" bgcolor="#CCFFCC"
| 77 || 25 || Montreal Canadiens || 3 - 2 || 40-28-9
|- align="center" bgcolor="#CCFFCC"
| 78 || 29 || Pittsburgh Penguins || 6 - 4 || 41-28-9
|- align="center" bgcolor="#FFBBBB"
| 79 || 31 || @ Hartford Whalers || 5 - 3 || 41-29-9
|-

|- align="center" bgcolor="#CCFFCC"
| 80 || 1 || Hartford Whalers || 2 - 0 || 42-29-9
|-

Playoffs

Key:  Win  Loss

Player statistics
Skaters

Goaltenders

†Denotes player spent time with another team before joining Rangers. Stats reflect time with Rangers only.
‡Traded mid-season. Stats reflect time with Rangers only.

Awards and records

Transactions

Draft picks
New York's picks at the 1983 NHL Entry Draft in Montreal, Quebec, Canada at the Montreal Forum.

Farm teams

References

New York Rangers seasons
New York Rangers
New York Rangers
New York Rangers
New York Rangers
1980s in Manhattan
Madison Square Garden